The Black Assassins were an early eighties punk rock band from Brisbane, Australia.

Keen exponents of the have a go and do it yourself ethos of the time, The Black Assassins formed in Brisbane in the middle of 1981, and played their first gig one week later at the QIT Campus Club from which they were banned from ever playing again. A review of their first performance saw them dubbed "the ugliest ... musicians ever to scar the stage" by the Brisbane's Courier Mail newspaper, after which they became known as "Brisbane's Ugliest Band".

The Black Assassins went on to play a total of 14 gigs in and around Brisbane during the following year before the bass player and guitarist moved to Sydney and formed the band Mutant Death. The Black Assassins continued to play sporadically in Brisbane till 1985, including supporting the Dead Kennedys at Brisbane's Festival Hall in 1983, and played one gig in Sydney in 1989.

The band was highly theatrical and usually pre-spent all the money they were paid for gigs on props and costumes for their performances. Their songs and stage act were energetic and highly political, focussing on issues of the day, having fun with imagery evoked by their name and the topics of their songs. It often involved doing things with dummies of corrupt politicians and interaction with members of the audience.  

The Black Assassins were: 
Sirhan Chapman, keyboards and vocals; 
Lee Harvey Hinckley, drums and vocals;
Mohammed El Jackal, guitar and vocals; 
Ruby Oswald, bass and vocals.

The Black Assassins finally released a CD of their music, 23 years late in November, 2005, The Black Assassins Greatest Hits. Recorded in six hours at Brisbane's Sunshine Studios, the album was produced and mixed by John Willsteed (of the Brisbane band Xero (band) and who later played with The Go-Betweens). The album features 13 of the band's most popular songs with audiences of the time. 

In December 2005 the band played their first gig in Brisbane for 20 years to launch the CD.
 
In 2007 The Black Assassins played a short set at the Jets Sports Club in Sydney on 5 May, and played one song at PIG CITY, a Queensland Music Festival event held at the University of Queensland in Brisbane on 14 July.

Discography 
The Black Assassins Greatest Hits CD, Reverberation, 2005.

External links
 

Australian punk rock groups
Musical groups from Brisbane
Musical groups established in 1981